The 2021 Tampere Open was a professional tennis tournament played on clay courts. It was the 39th edition of the tournament which was part of the 2021 ATP Challenger Tour. It took place in Tampere, Finland, on 19–25 July 2021.

Men's singles main draw entrants

Seeds 

 1 Rankings as of 12 July 2021.

Other entrants 
The following players received wildcards into the singles main draw:
  Leo Borg
  Patrik Niklas-Salminen
  Otto Virtanen

The following player received entry into the singles main draw as a special exempt:
  Mario Vilella Martínez

The following players received entry into the singles main draw as alternates:
  Jonáš Forejtek
  Orlando Luz

The following players received entry from the qualifying draw:
  Geoffrey Blancaneaux
  Bogdan Bobrov
  Arthur Cazaux
  Nicolás Kicker

The following players received entry as lucky losers:
  Alexander Erler
  Kyrian Jacquet

Champions

Singles

 Jiří Lehečka def.  Nicolás Kicker 5–7, 6–4, 6–3.

Doubles

 Pedro Cachín /  Facundo Mena def.  Orlando Luz /  Felipe Meligeni Alves 7–5, 6–3.

References

2021
Tampere Open
Tampere Open
July 2021 sports events in Europe